Eugene Anthony Chaplin (born August 23, 1953) is a Swiss recording engineer and documentary filmmaker. He is the fifth child of Oona O'Neill and Charlie Chaplin, the grandson of playwright Eugene O'Neill, and the father of film actress Kiera Chaplin.

He was part of the cast in the Benny Hill The Worlds Funniest Clown (1991), he is the president of the International Comedy Film Festival of Vevey, Switzerland and he directed the documentary film Charlie Chaplin: A Family Tribute produced by Alexandre Alé de Basseville. Eugene has also created the musical Smile, which is a narration of Charlie Chaplin's life through his music. 

As a recording engineer, he worked with The Rolling Stones, David Bowie, and Queen.

References

External links

1953 births
Living people
Eugene
Place of birth missing (living people)
Swiss audio engineers
Swiss people of British descent
Swiss people of English descent
Swiss people of American descent
Swiss people of Irish descent
20th-century Swiss engineers
21st-century Swiss engineers